Karine Quentrec Eagle (born 21 October 1969) is a former professional tennis player from France who competed on the WTA Tour from 1985 to 1996.

She attained a career-high ranking of No. 46 in January 1992. During her career, she reached the third round of the French Open twice and won one WTA singles title.

WTA career finals

Singles: 1 (runner-up)

ITF finals

Singles (3–1)

Doubles (5–2)

External links
 
 

1969 births
French female tennis players
Living people
Tennis players from Marseille
20th-century French women